The Miss Stone Affair was the kidnapping of American Protestant missionary Ellen Maria Stone and her pregnant Bulgarian fellow missionary and friend Katerina Cilka by the pro-Bulgarian Internal Macedonian Revolutionary Organization.

History

Background 
In 1901, one of the main problems facing the Internal Macedonian Revolutionary Organization was the lack of resources for armaments. This financial crisis was discussed at the meeting of the leadership of IMRO in Kyustendil, Bulgaria that summer. At the meeting, Gotse Delchev argued that small robberies only tarnished the reputation of the organization and were not helpful to solving the financial problem. Delchev then authorized Mihail Gerdzhikov to carry out the kidnapping of a wealthy person or persons in Macedonia to obtain funds, but he failed. Delchev made two other unsuccessful attempts with wealthy Turks and Greeks. He later developed a plan to kidnap the son of Ivan Evstratiev Geshov, which also failed. Yane Sandanski then offered to kidnap Ferdinand of Bulgaria during his visit to the Rila Monastery, but this radical plan was opposed by Delchev, who believed that the abduction must be done on Ottoman territory. Chernopeev and Sandanski discussed the kidnapping of a wealthy Turk near Simitli, but this plan was not realized. Sandanski, Hristo Chernopeev and  prepared a plan for the kidnapping of Süleyman Bey, but due to his illness this action also failed.

Kidnapping 
Sandanski was then drawn to the idea of kidnapping a Protestant missionary of Bansko. A detachment led by the voivoda Yane Sandanski and the sub-voivodas Hristo Chernopeev and Krǎstyo Asenov carried this out on August 21, 1901. Two women—Ellen Maria Stone and her fellow missionary Katerina Stefanova-Cilka—were kidnapped somewhere between Bansko and Gorna Dzhumaya, then towns in the Ottoman Empire.

The goal of the kidnapping was to receive a heavy ransom and aid the financially struggling IMRO. The detachment was pursued by the Ottoman and Bulgarian authorities and by a cheta of the contending organization Supreme Macedonian Committee. Ottoman authorities for a short time, arrested Grigor Cilka, husband of Katerina on unfounded charges of being complicit in the kidnapping. Sometimes regarded as a case of the Stockholm syndrome (with the kidnappers even assisting Cilka in giving birth to her daughter), the affair ended after intensive negotiations in early 1902, half a year after the kidnapping. IMRO was paid a ransom of 14,000 Turkish gold liras on January 18, 1902, in Bansko, and the hostages were released on February 2 near Strumica.

Widely covered by the media at the time, the event has been often dubbed "America's first modern hostage crisis".

References

Further reading
 
 

 Some archive photos concerning the case.

Macedonian Struggle
Hostage taking
1901 in Bulgaria
1902 in Bulgaria
Internal Macedonian Revolutionary Organization
Protestant missionaries in Bulgaria